Louella Persons is monologue written by Secun de la Rosa which currently runs at La casa de la Portera in Madrid, Spain, starring Natalie Pinot as Louella Persons and directed by Benjamin de la Rosa.

Plot summary

Louella Persons tells the story of the first major official gossip that existed in the world of social commentary, Louella Parsons, and her rise and fall. From a small start writing in newspapers to how she managed to settle, reign Hollywood and become a moral judge of American society with her columns delving into the lives of the most famous of the golden age of cinema.

References

External links
 Official Website

Spanish plays
2013 plays